Australian Homemade is a franchise formula for confectionery stores owned by Australian Homemade, based in Veenendaal, Netherlands. The very first store had been set up by the Belgian Frederik Van Isacker. The stores produce and sell ice cream and chocolate using all natural ingredients. The products incorporate Indigenous Australian designs.

There are currently over 50 stores found in the Netherlands, Germany, Belgium, Spain, and the United States.

Aboriginal Reaction
Some Indigenous Australians reacted with anger at Australian Homemade, accusing them of using Aboriginal designs without permission and of being disrespectful.

In defence, the company says the designs were by a Dutch artist inspired by indigenous art and had no intention of causing offence to Indigenous Australians. They were reportedly working with the Aboriginal and Torres Strait Islander Commission (ATSIC) to help promote Aboriginal issues.

See also
 Chocolaterie
 Foreign branding

References

External links
Australian Homemade Homepage

Dutch chocolate companies
Ice cream parlors
Ice cream brands
Retail companies established in 1979
Restaurant chains in Australia
Australian-themed retailers
Dairy products companies of the Netherlands
1979 establishments in the Netherlands